Mystical Anarchism was a tendency within the Russian Symbolist movement after 1906, especially between 1906 and late 1908. It was created and popularized by Georgy Chulkov. 

In 1906, Chulkov edited Fakely (Torches), an anthology of Symbolist writing, which called on Russian writers to:

abandon Symbolism and Decadence and move forward to "new mystical experience".

Later in the year Chulkov followed up with a "Mystical Anarchism" manifesto.

The doctrine has been described as:

a mish-mash of Nietzsche, Herzen, Bakunin, Merezhkovsky (Chulkov was a former editor of New Path), Ibsen, Byron, utopian socialism, Tolstoy's Christian anarchism, and Dostoyevsky's rejection of necessity.

Alexander Blok and especially Vyacheslav Ivanov were supportive of the new doctrine while Valery Bryusov, the editor of the leading Symbolist magazine The Balance, and Andrei Bely were opposed to it. The resulting controversy raged on the pages of Russian Symbolist magazines until late 1908.

See also
Russian avant-garde

Notes

References
Bernice Glatzer Rosenthal. "The Transmutation of the Symbolist Ethos: Mystical Anarchism and the Revolution of 1905" in Slavic Review 36, No. 4 (December 1977), pp. 608–627.

Literary movements
Modern art
Anarchist culture
Russian art movements
Symbolism (arts)
Anarchist schools of thought